George Holt Rogers was a Democratic politician from California who served in the California State Assembly and California State Senate. He served as the 18th Speaker of the Assembly between 1869 and 1870, being the first speaker to serve in the current state capitol after its opening.

While serving in the state Senate, Rogers wrote and introduced the Rogers Free Library Act which allowed cities to create taxpayer-funded public libraries free at the point of service.

References 

Year of birth missing
Year of death missing
Speakers of the California State Assembly